1995 in Armenian football was a transitional season. For this season the Armenian Premier League was composed of twelve clubs in two groups of six. No championship was awarded, and no teams were relegated or promoted.

Premier League
Aragats FC were promoted from the Armenian First League.
Homenmen-FIMA Yerevan de-merged into 2 separate clubs: FIMA Yerevan and Homenmen Yerevan. FIMA Yerevan withdrew from the competition and retired from professional football for 3 seasons. (they returned to the Armenian First League in 1998). Homenmen entered the competition under the name Homenmen Yerevan.

League tables

Group 1

Group 2

First League
 Arpa FC withdrew from the competition.
 Kanaz Yerevan changed its name to FC Arabkir.
 FC Vanadzor changed its name to Astgh Vanadzor.
 Sipan Vardenis changed its name back to Lernagorts Vardenis FC.
 Araks Armavir returned to professional football and changed its name to FC Armavir.
 FC Artashat returned to professional football and changed its name to FC Dvin Artashat.
 Tsement-2 Ararat are brought up to make a 2-group, 16 team competition.

League tables

Group 1

Group 2

Armenia Cup

External links
 RSSSF: Armenia 1995